Saint Gwrfyw, was a pre-congregational saint of medieval Wales.

Family
He was the son of Pasgen ab Urien Rheged, of the family of Coel Godhebog, and father of Saint Nidan. 

A single manuscript holds that he had brothers Mydan and Llamined who the Venedotian Tribes of Collwyn ab Tangno and Marchweithian traced their descent through him.

Career
He is said to have a church dedicated to him in Anglesey, but its situation does not appear to be now known. There was formerly a Capel Gorfyw at Bangor, but it has long since disappeared. The only written evidence of him is as a witness to a land grant in Monmouthshire.

References

5th-century Welsh people
5th-century births
Roman Catholic monks
Welsh Roman Catholic saints
Medieval Welsh saints
Year of birth unknown
Year of death unknown